Levi Maish (November 22, 1837 – February 26, 1899) was a Democratic member of the U.S. House of Representatives from Pennsylvania.

Early life
Levi Maish was born in Conewago Township, York County, Pennsylvania.  He attended the common schools and the York County Academy.  He taught school in Manchester Township and in York.

Civil War
During the American Civil War, Maish recruited a company for the Union Army in 1862, and because of this joined the 130th Pennsylvania Volunteer Infantry as a Captain. He was promoted to lieutenant colonel because of his education.  In less than two months he was involved in the battle of Antietam, wounded severely in the upper chest and lung, leading an advance across the cornfield in front of the initially strong defensive position of the sunken road. During his convalescence, he was promoted to colonel.  After the Battle of Fredericksburg.  He was mustered out with his regiment at the expiration of its term of service on May 21, 1863.

Education and Pennsylvania state service
Maish attended lectures in the law department of the University of Pennsylvania at Philadelphia, and was admitted to the bar in 1864. He served as a member of the Pennsylvania State House of Representatives in 1867 and 1868.  He was appointed by the legislature in 1872 as one of a commission to reexamine and reaudit the accounts of certain public officers of York County, Pennsylvania.

United States House of Representatives
Maish was elected as a Democrat to the Forty-fourth and Forty-fifth Congresses. He was an unsuccessful candidate for reelection in 1878.  He was again elected to the Fiftieth and Fifty-first Congresses.  He was an unsuccessful candidate for reelection in 1890.  He was engaged in the practice of law in Washington, D.C., until his death there in 1899.  Interment in Arlington National Cemetery.

Freemasonry
Maish was made a Mason in York Lodge No. 266, F.&A.M., in York, Pennsylvania on January 6, 1863. He resigned in 1869 to become a warrant member of Zeredatha Lodge No. 451 in York, of which he was subsequently elected to serve as Worshipful Master in 1873.

References
 Retrieved on 2008-02-14
The Political Graveyard
Zeredatha-White Rose Lodge No. 451, F.&A.M.

1837 births
1899 deaths
Democratic Party members of the Pennsylvania House of Representatives
Pennsylvania lawyers
Union Army colonels
People from York County, Pennsylvania
Burials at Arlington National Cemetery
People of Pennsylvania in the American Civil War
Democratic Party members of the United States House of Representatives from Pennsylvania
19th-century American politicians
19th-century American lawyers